The Picador (French: Le picador) is a 1932 French drama film directed by Lucien Jaquelux and starring Ginette d'Yd, Madeleine Guitty and Jean Mauran.

Cast
 Ginette d'Yd 
 Madeleine Guitty 
 Jean Mauran 
 Enrique Rivero

References

Bibliography 
 Crisp, Colin. Genre, Myth and Convention in the French Cinema, 1929-1939. Indiana University Press, 2002.

External links 
 

1932 films
1930s French-language films
French black-and-white films
French drama films
1932 drama films
1930s French films